is a Japanese BL manga series written and illustrated by Shungiku Nakamura. In 2011, the manga was adapted into an anime television series. Produced by Studio Deen under the direction of Chiaki Kon, the anime series began its broadcast run on April 9, 2011. An original animation DVD was bundled with the fifth and sixth volumes of the manga series, released in March and September 2011. A film adaptation was released on March 15, 2014.

On December 13, 2016, Funimation announced they had licensed the series, including the OVA. It was released on home-video on March 7, 2017.

A new anime adaptation focused on the Proposal Arc has been announced to celebrate the fifth anniversary of the new Emerald magazine. It premiered on February 21, 2020. In June 2021, the anime was revisited by Funimation's Aedan Juvet where it was praised for its expansion of LGBTQ+ representation in anime.

Sekai-ichi Hatsukoi is a spin-off of Junjo Romantica, another series by the same author.

Plot 
Ritsu Onodera, a literary editor, resigns from his father's publishing company, due to his coworkers' jealousy toward his success, claiming that he is simply riding his father's coattails. He applies for a position at Marukawa Publishing in order to move away from his father's shadow, but instead of his preferred department of literature, he is placed in the infamous shōjo manga department, Emerald. He initially considers resigning, especially because he finds his new boss, Masamune Takano, intolerable and unnerving from the very beginning; however, Takano inadvertently convinces Onodera to stick with the job by calling him "useless," his pride forcing him to stay in order to prove his worth. Later, Onodera learns that Takano's old family name was Saga, and that he was an older schoolmate from high school that Onodera fell in love with and confessed to. It turns out Takano still has feelings for Onodera, and he tells him he will make him fall in love with him again. The series shows how Takano slowly achieves this goal, and the obstacles the two face.

There are also two other couples in this show; their stories are shown in later episodes. The characters follow Onodera's fellow editors: Hatori and his longtime friend (and manga artist he's in charge of) Yoshino, as well as Kisa and the attractive bookstore employee he has his eye on, Yukina.

An extra novel follows salesman and longtime friend of Takano's, Yokozawa, as he's swept off his feet following a harsh breakup by attractive widower and single father Kirishima.

Characters 

Ritsu Onodera is a 25-year-old jaded literary editor. He is the only son of the head of Onodera Publications, previously working at his father's company in the literature department. Hearing his fellow co-workers accusing him of only getting ahead due to his father's influence, he decides to show that he can be successful on his own by going to work at Marukawa Publishing. After being hurt by his first love in high school when he was 15, Onodera vowed to never fall in love again. His resolve is tested, however, when he is reunited with the boy he once loved, Masamune Takano. With Takano now very much a man and his new boss, things become very complicated for Onodera as he must juggle his career and his feelings for his first love.
Before transferring to Marukawa Publishing, Onodera was an editor in charge Ryouichi Sumi, father of Misaki's friend Keiichi Sumi (also from Junjou Romantica).

The 27-year-old Masamune Takano, formerly known as Masamune Saga before his parents' divorce and his mother's remarriage, is the editor-in-chief of the Emerald department at Marukawa Publishing, where he is sometimes referred to as "the Capable." He and Onodera were once in a brief relationship in high school, but split up over a misunderstanding. It is later revealed that, during college, Takano went through a breakdown from his breakup with Onodera, family problems, and other personal issues, which in turn left him with unresolved feelings for Onodera. When both he and Onodera realize who each other are, he promises Onodera that he will make him fall in love with him again, much to Onodera's contempt.
In Sekai-ichi Hatsukoi: Takano Masamune no Baai (lit. "Masamune Takano's Case"), the reader sees Takano's perspective on his and Onodera's first meeting and romantic development.

An Kohinata is Onodera's childhood friend and his fiancée, due to an agreement their parents made when the two were kids; however, Onodera does not view her as his fiancée. Sweet, polite and sensitive, An has deep feelings for him, despite being rejected by Onodera (whom she calls "Ricchan") when she confessed her love.

Haitani is Takano's former co-worker at his previous job. He wishes to take revenge on Takano's for "stealing" his ex-lover. He seems to develop feelings for Ritsu, though it is unknown where it's genuine or not. He is later revealed to be bisexual.

Chiaki Yoshino is a 28-year-old shōjo manga artist known under the pseudonym Chiharu Yoshikawa (a female name). His editor in-charge is Hatori Yoshiyuki, who is also his childhood friend. His two best friends are Hatori and Yuu Yanase, but the lines between friendship and love begin to blur after a number of confusing incidents. Yoshino begins to question his feelings for Hatori after witnessing him and Yanase together in what he thinks is a kiss; then Hatori kisses him one night and confesses his feelings. Yoshino begins to realize he has to confront his true feelings or risk losing them both.

Hatori, also known as Tori, is 28 years old and an editor in Marukawa's Emerald department. Although in the beginning he is seen as serious and reserved, it is later revealed that he has secretly harbored deep feelings for his childhood friend, Yoshino. After confessing his love, Hatori pulls away fearing that Yoshino doesn't feel the same, who he believes loves his rival, Yanase, instead. However, unbeknownst to Hatori, Yoshino does somewhat return those same feelings.

Chief assistant for manga artist Chiaki Yoshino, Yuu Yanase came to know both Hatori and Yoshino when they were in junior high school. An immediate tension is visible between Hatori and Yuu, though it isn't until later that it is discovered that both are vying for the love of Yoshino.

Kisa is a fellow editor in the Emerald department and 30 years old, though he is usually mistaken for being much younger due to his looks. He considers himself gay but has never been in a serious relationship; in fact, he doesn't think himself capable of being in one because of his tendency to fall for a guy's good looks without knowing their personality. Because of this, he immediately questions his feelings for Kou and doesn't hold out much hope for a relationship with him. His mentality can be described by his line, "Love at first sight works well enough in manga, but this is reality."

Kou Yukina is a 21-year-old clerk in charge of the shōjo manga section at the popular bookstore, Marimo Books. He's been aware of Kisa coming in to watch him, though he initially believed Kisa was just a shy high school student. When he discovers that Kisa is the editor behind all of his favorite works, however, he begins to develop romantic feelings for him, despite considering himself straight prior to their meeting. Throughout their relationship, Kou shows that he is more than willing to fight for Kisa, whom he tries to make understand that what they feel for each other is real and whom he believes to have the capability to fall in love.

Yokozawa works in the sales department at Marukawa. He is a close friend of Takano's, with whom he had a physical relationship when they were both in college. It is common knowledge in the publishing world that Yokozawa helped Takano get into publishing and his position at Marukawa. He is seriously jealous of and resents Onodera, whom he blames for "screwing up" Takano ten years ago. He often warns Onodera away from Takano, even going as far as proclaiming Takano is his.
He has his own side story entitled Takafumi Yokozawa No Baai about his new love interest, Kirishima Zen, as he handles his rejection by Takano.

Zen Kirishima was first introduced in Junjou Romantica as the editor-in-chief of Japun, the shōnen manga magazine; here, he is now the new love interest for Yokozawa. He is raising his daughter, Hiyori, on his own due to his wife's passing a few years ago. After blackmailing Yokozawa, the two begin dating upon realizing their feelings for one another. He has a habit of teasing Yokozawa, calling him the "mother" of his daughter Hiyori.

Hiyori is the 10-year-old daughter and only child of Zen Kirishima and his wife, the latter of whom died some time ago. She bonds quickly with Yokozawa, to whom she refers as "Onii-san" (big brother/older male figure). She's responsible for cooking her father's meals and is very fond of kittens and green tea sweets.

Kanade Mino is a fellow editor in the Emerald department at Marukawa, who is constantly smiling through all the stress and exhaustion. It has been hinted that he has a dark side, with Takano stating, "Make sure you don't make Mino upset."

Isaka is the president of Marukawa Publishing and he is acquainted with Onodera's parents. He also appears as a character in Junjou Romantica. In "Junjou Mistake," the reader learns he has been in a relationship with his secretary/childhood playmate Asahina for the past ten years after both acknowledged their mutual feelings. He once aspired to be a novelist, but realized his real talents lay in finding future best-sellers. Like Onodera, others once implied that Isaka's success only came from his family's influence (when in reality it was his talent in nurturing authors to greatness), so he feels a kinship with Onodera, which annoys Onodera who wants to get away from that image.

Asahina is Ryūichiro's assistant, who came to work for the Isaka family when they helped the Asahina family out of a bad situation. Originally intended to be Isaka's playmate, he ended up becoming something more of a caretaker and developed feelings for Isaka at a young age.

Ritsu's close friend and former co-worker from Onedera Publication, Ritsu's family's company.

A famous mangaka working for Emerald at Marukawa Publishing. Because her work is extremely popular, she is very wealthy and lives a luxurious lifestyle.

Media

Manga 

Written and illustrated by Shungiku Nakamura, Sekai-ichi Hatsukoi began serialization in the November 2006 issue of The Ruby magazine, which went on sale October 13, 2006. It moved to Asuka Ciel magazine in July 2009 where it continued through May 2014. Publisher Kadokawa announced in May 2014 that it would launch a real-life version of the Emerald manga magazine from Shungiku Nakamura's Sekai-ichi Hatsukoi manga. As of August 2014, Sekai-ichi Hatsukoi and Nakamura's other manga Junjou Romantica have switched publications to Emerald magazine. The individual chapters have been released as seventeen tankōbon volumes by Kadokawa Shoten's Asuka Comic CL-DX branch. The first volume was published on July 1, 2008, and the seventeenth on April 30, 2022.

The first eight volumes of Sekai-ichi Hatsukoi have been licensed for an English release in February 2015 by SuBlime, a subsidiary of North American manga publisher Viz Media. The English title will be The World's Greatest First Love: The Case of Ritsu Onodera, and volume one will print in February 2015. Subsequent releases will be every other month thereafter. The series was originally licensed for English-language release in North America by Tokyopop's Blu Manga, with volume 1 due for release on 12 July 2011 but went unused due to the 31 May 2011 closure of Tokyopop's publishing efforts.

Novels 

As of April 2011, there have been four novels published telling the story of Hatori and Yoshino, titled Yoshino Chiaki no Baai (The Case of Chiaki Yoshino), authored by Fujisaki Miyako. There are also mini-comics drawn by Shungiku Nakamura included at the end of each novel.

As of December 2012, three novels about Yokozawa and his new lover have been published, titled "Yokozawa Takafumi no Baai" (The Case of Takafumi Yokozawa). These novels also include mini-comics. In 2013's January issue of Asuka Ciel magazine, it was confirmed that an anime adaptation film of this story is currently in development. The series director, Chiaki Kon, will also be directing the film. In addition, a special Sekai-ichi Hatsukoi anime short called "Valentine-hen" will screen alongside the film on March 15, 2014.The Case of Chiaki YoshinoThe Case of Chiaki Yoshino (Omnibus)Reprints of volume 1-4 of The Case of Chiaki Yoshino.The Case of Takafumi YokozawaThe Case of Takafumi Yokozawa (omnibus)Reprints of Volumes 1-6 of The Case of Takafumi Yokozawa. The Case of Yoshiyuki HatoriThe Case of Animate'

Anime 
The first season opening for the anime is "Sekai de Ichiban Koishiteru" by Shuhei Kita and the ending is "Ashita Boku wa Kimi ni Ai ni Iku" by Wakaba. The second season opening is "Sekai no Hate ni Kimi ga Itemo" by Shuhei Kita and the ending is "Aikotoba" by Sakura Merry-Men. The second season featured Junjou Mistake in episode 6. An OVA, bundled with the limited edition manga Vol. 6, was released in September.  A new anime adaptation, focusing on the Proposal Arc premiered on February 21, 2020.

Season 1

Season 2

References

External links 
 Sekai-ichi Hatsukoi—official anime website 
 Sekai-ichi Hatsukoi—official movie website 
 —official publishing magazine website 
 
 

2007 Japanese novels
2011 anime OVAs
2011 anime television series debuts
2011 Japanese novels
2011 Japanese television series endings
2014 anime films
Anime series based on manga
Animated films based on manga
Funimation
Japanese LGBT-related animated television series
Japanese-language films
Josei manga
Light novels
Kadokawa Dwango franchises
Manga adapted into films
Medialink
Studio Deen
SuBLime manga
Yaoi anime and manga
2000s LGBT literature
2010s LGBT-related comedy television series
LGBT-related animated films